Lim's Café was a Chinese and American restaurant located on North Market Street in Redding, California. On August 30, 2022 it was reported that the restaurant would close on September 6 after 90 years in business.

History
Lim's Café was opened for business in 1933 by Peter Lim, an immigrant from China. In 1994, Lim passed the restaurant down to his daughter Jamie Lim and her brothers who eventually sold the establishment to restaurateurs Jeff Garrett and Lon Tatom who plan to open a different restaurant on the site.

References

1933 establishments in California
Restaurants established in 1933
Redding, California
Restaurants in California
Companies based in Shasta County, California
American Chinese cuisine